The Charterhouse of the Transfiguration is the only Carthusian monastery in the United States, located on Mt. Equinox, in Sandgate, Vermont. It was founded in 1960 under the initiative of Fr. Thomas Verner Moore and completed in 1970. It superseded the earlier monastery at Sky Farm and Grace Farm (Charterhouse of Our Lady of Bethlehem), near Whitingham, Vermont, which Fr. Thomas had established in 1950.

The   property was donated by Joseph George Davidson, a retired Union Carbide Corporation executive.

The charterhouse was designed by architect Victor Christ-Janer & Associates of New Canaan, Connecticut, and fabricated of Vermont granite blocks.

References

External links
Charterhouse of the Transfiguration website
Photo-tour of the charterhouse

Taconic Mountains
Carthusian monasteries in the United States
Buildings and structures in Arlington, Vermont
Brutalist architecture in Vermont